Siberian University of Consumer Cooperation is a university in Leninsky District of  Novosibirsk, Russia. It was founded in 1956.

History
In 1956, the Novosibirsk Institute of Soviet Cooperative Trade was established.

In the early 1970s, the campus of the institute was practically formed, it included 2 educational buildings, 4 dormitories, 4 residential buildings for teachers and employees of the institute. Later, a children's center for 140 places was also built.

Faculties
 Faculty of Economics and Management
 Faculty of Commerce and Technology
 Faculty of Law

Branches
The university has branches in Tyumen, Kyzyl, Ulan-Ude, Chita and Yakutsk.

Bibliography
 

Education in Novosibirsk
1956 establishments in Russia
Educational institutions established in 1956
Leninsky District, Novosibirsk
Universities in Novosibirsk Oblast